Sanna Clementsson (born 2001) is a Swedish world champion bridge player. In April 2022, she achieved the title of World Grand Master as the youngest female player ever. She was 19 when she became the youngest winner of the Venice Cup in 2019.

Bridge accomplishments

Wins
 Venice Cup (2) 2019, 2022

References

External links
 

Living people
2001 births
Swedish contract bridge players